Vanda Symon (born 1969) is a crime writer and radio host from Dunedin, New Zealand, and the Chair of the Otago Southland Branch of the New Zealand Society of Authors. Three of her novels have been shortlisted for New Zealand's annual Ngaio Marsh Award for Best Crime Novel.

Life
Born in Tauranga, she grew up there and then in Hawke's Bay. Symon calls herself "the product of a life-long love affair with books", having developed a strong love of reading at an early age. She has said her first books obsession was with the Berenstain Bears series of children's books – before she moved on to "camping out at the library" and a steady diet of Rosemary Sutcliff and TH White. The latter's The Sword in the Stone led her to a love of all things Camelot, a fascination with medieval times, and even choosing fencing as her sport.

After high school, Symon headed south to study pharmacy at the University of Otago in Dunedin. She practised as a pharmacist in the community and at the local hospice until 1999. She started a family in 2000, and began writing full-time while looking after her children in Hawke's Bay.

She returned to Dunedin in 2005 before her first novel was published.

Symon is a full-time mother and writer, and also produces and hosts a monthly books-focused radio show 'Write On' on Toroa Radio (It airs live on the second Wednesday of each month on Hills AM Community Radio 1575 kHz from noon to 1:00pm), serves as the Chair of the Otago Southland Branch of the New Zealand Society of Authors, and does monthly book reviews for Dunedin Diary on Channel 9 Television.

In 2018 Symon completed a PhD at the University of Otago, with a thesis on science in crime fiction.

Writing
Symon's first novel, Overkill, was published in March 2007 in New Zealand by Penguin Books. It introduces series heroine Sam Shephard, and centres on the looks-like suicide death of a young mother in a small rural town in New Zealand. Symon told the Otago Daily Times that: “Overkill was 4 ½ years from go to whoa. This was very part time fitting in snippets of writing around babies and the associated demands of feeding, play, dealing with messes of all origins, household running and eyeballs-falling-out-of-head tiredness.” 

Symon followed with the publication of her second novel The Ringmaster in August 2008. She has had some international success, with the German translation of Overkill, Ein Harmloser Mord, being published by Blanvalet in October 2008. Symon's third novel featuring Detective Sam Shephard, Containment, was published in November 2009, appeared on the New Zealand Adult Fiction Bestsellers List, and was on the shortlist for the inaugural Ngaio Marsh Award for Best Crime Novel.

A fourth novel in the Sam Shephard series, Bound, appeared in 2011. Bound was shortlisted for the Ngaio Marsh Award. Symon's fifth novel, a standalone thriller called The Faceless, was published in 2012. Set in Auckland, it too was shortlisted for the Ngaio Marsh Award.

Radio
Symon's hosts Write On, the radio show of the Otago Southland branch of the New Zealand Society of Authors, broadcast on Toroa Radio 1575 kHz AM.

Crime novels 
Sam Shephard series
 2007: Overkill
 2008: The Ringmaster
 2009: Containment
 2011: Bound
Other
 2012: The Faceless

References

External links
 Official Vanda Symon site
 Overkill – Thoughts from the mind of a serial crime writer – Official Vanda Symon blog
 NZ Book Month Interview with Vanda Symon
 New Zealand Society of Authors official website

1969 births
Mass media people from Dunedin
Living people
Women crime fiction writers
New Zealand crime fiction writers
New Zealand women novelists
University of Otago alumni
21st-century New Zealand novelists
21st-century New Zealand women writers
Writers from Dunedin